Sperrbezirk is a 1966 West German comedy drama film directed by Will Tremper and starring Harald Leipnitz, Suzanne Roquette and Guido Baumann. It is adapted from a story by Ernst Neubach. The film was also known as Sperrbezirk, das Geschäft mit der Unmoral (Sperrbezirk, the business of immorality).

Plot
Young and attractive Ann works in a Berlin drive-in cinema. One day, she meets an eloquent and charming estate agent, Bernie Kallmann, who Ann quickly falls in love with. Unknown to Ann, Bernie's apparent attraction towards her, as with many other women, is because Kallmann is a pimp and a significant member of the ring that controls all prostitution in the city.

When Bernie knows Ann's feelings for sure, he persuades her to work on the streets a prostitute. Bernie makes a big mistake, he falls in love with Ann. Now Kallmann, after he has pushed his beau into prostitution, tries to get Ann out of it. This causes massive conflicts with the rest of the pimp gang. Kallmann has to pay for the rediscovery of his humanity with his own life.

Cast
 Harald Leipnitz ...  Bernie Kallmann 
 Suzanne Roquette ...  Ann 
 Guido Baumann ...  Detlev Rhombus 
 Rudolf Schündler ...  Klipitzki 
 Ruth Maria Kubitschek ...  Blue Eyed 
 Ingeborg Schöner ...  Jolly 
 Karel Štěpánek ...  Inspector Wagner  
 Bruce Low ...  Police President 
 Christian Rode ...  Fopper 
 Helga Zeckra ...  Detta 
 Ursula van der Wielen ...  Dora 
 Christina von Falz-Fein ...  Baroness 
 Ernst Neubach ...  Napoleon 
 Max Nosseck ...  Nossy 
 Hans Bergmann ...  Schameczco

Reviews
Tremper himself described Sperrbezirk as "A gruesome story of an naive country girl, which becomes a hooker out of love."

The Lexikon des internationalen Films summed the film up as "a draw between mischief, brutality and speculation fluctuating colportage. The implied dispute with prostitution is merely inadequate camouflage."

References

External links

1966 films
German thriller drama films
West German films
1960s German-language films
Films directed by Will Tremper
Films about prostitution in Germany
Films based on short fiction
1960s thriller drama films
1966 drama films
1960s German films